This is an alphabetical index of articles related to curves used in mathematics.

 Acnode
 Algebraic curve
 Arc
 Asymptote
 Asymptotic curve
 Barbier's theorem
 Bézier curve
 Bézout's theorem
 Birch and Swinnerton-Dyer conjecture
 Bitangent
 Bitangents of a quartic
 Cartesian coordinate system
 Caustic
 Cesàro equation
 Chord (geometry)
 Cissoid
 Circumference
 Closed timelike curve
 concavity
 Conchoid (mathematics)
 Confocal
 Contact (mathematics)
 Contour line
 Crunode
 Cubic Hermite curve
 Curvature
 Curve orientation
 Curve fitting
 Curve-fitting compaction
 Curve of constant width
 Curve of pursuit
 Curves in differential geometry
 Cusp
 Cyclogon
 De Boor algorithm
 Differential geometry of curves
 Eccentricity (mathematics)
 Elliptic curve cryptography
 Envelope (mathematics)
 Fenchel's theorem
 Genus (mathematics)
 Geodesic
 Geometric genus
 Great-circle distance
 Harmonograph
 Hedgehog (curve) 
 Hilbert's sixteenth problem
 Hyperelliptic curve cryptography
 Inflection point
 Inscribed square problem
 intercept, y-intercept, x-intercept
 Intersection number
 Intrinsic equation
 Isoperimetric inequality
 Jordan curve
 Jordan curve theorem
 Knot
 Limit cycle
 Linking coefficient
 List of circle topics
 Loop (knot)
 M-curve
 Mannheim curve
 Meander (mathematics)
 Mordell conjecture
 Natural representation
 Opisometer
 Orbital elements
 Osculating circle
 Osculating plane
 Osgood curve
 Parallel (curve)
 Parallel transport
 Parametric curve
 Bézier curve
 Spline (mathematics)
 Hermite spline
 Beta spline
 B-spline
 Higher-order spline
 NURBS
 Perimeter
 Pi
 Plane curve
 Pochhammer contour
 Polar coordinate system
 Prime geodesic
 Projective line
 Ray
 Regular parametric representation
 Reuleaux triangle
 Ribaucour curve
 Riemann–Hurwitz formula
 Riemann–Roch theorem
 Riemann surface
 Road curve
 Sato–Tate conjecture
 secant
 Singular solution
 Sinuosity
 Slope
 Space curve
 Spinode
 Square wheel
 Subtangent
 Tacnode
 Tangent
 Tangent space
 Tangential angle
 Torsion of curves
 Trajectory
 Transcendental curve
 W-curve
 Whewell equation
 World line

See also
 Curve
 List of curves
 List of differential geometry topics

 
Curve